No Looking Back is a 2021 Russian dark comedy crime film written and directed by Kirill Sokolov. The film tells about three aggressive women's quarrels - a little daughter, her mother, and her grandmother are pointing guns at each other. It stars Sofya Krugova, Viktoriya Korotkova, and Anna Mikhalkova.

No Looking Back was theatrically released in Russia on April 21, 2022, by PROvzglyad.

Plot 
Olya was in prison for four years and decided to start a new life with the help of her daughter. But her daughter lives with her grandmother and she is not going to part with her granddaughter.

Cast

Production
A full-length feature directed by Kirill Sokolov after the 2019 black comedy Why Don't You Just Die! how a men's son kills his father. The producers of the film are Artem Vasilyev and Igor Mishin, as well as Andrey Savelyev. The film is being shot with the support of the Ministry of Culture of the Russian Federation and the Kinoprime Foundation for the Development of Contemporary Cinematography, as well as with the participation of the SAGa Film Company.

Casting 
This approach is due to the fact that the actress playing one of the main characters of the film, Sofya Krugova. Since the film was Sofya's debut acting work, the creators decided to shoot the comedy in chronological order according to the script, so that it would be easier for the girl to navigate.

Filming 
Principal photography process was supposed to start back in May 2020, but due to the pandemic, it was postponed to early July. They will go to the city of Tver and Tver Oblast forest. At the very end, four shifts are planned in the backwater near the Volga River - in a remote and very picturesque place. A small interior block will be filmed in Moscow.

Release

Theatrical 
The film premiered in September 2021 at the Kinotavr Film Festival. Critics note the originality of Kirill Sokolov's directing style.

See also
 Freeway (1996 film)

References

External links 
 

2021 films
2020s crime comedy films
2021 black comedy films
2020s feminist films
2020s prison films
2020s comedy road movies
2020s Russian-language films
Russian crime comedy films
Russian black comedy films
Russian comedy road movies
Russian films about revenge
Rape and revenge films
Splatter films
Films about mother–daughter relationships
Girls with guns films